was an admiral in the Imperial Japanese Navy during World War II.

Early career 
Gotō was born in Ibaraki prefecture in 1888. He graduated from the 38th class of the Imperial Japanese Naval Academy in 1910, ranked 30th out of a class of 149 cadets. As a midshipman, he served on the cruiser  and battleship .

After his promotion to sub-lieutenant in 1913, Gotō served on the destroyer Murakumo. During World War I, he was sent to the South Pacific to man a radio outpost, and later as a crewman on the cruiser . After his promotion to lieutenant in 1917, he served on the battleship , the destroyer Tanikaze and the cruiser .

Gotō was promoted to captain on 15 November 1933.

Gotō became a rear admiral on 15 November 1939 and was made commander of Cruiser Division 2.

World War II 
On 23 December 1941, CruDiv6 supported the second assault on Wake Island in which Japanese troops were able to capture the island after the intense Battle of Wake Island. In May 1942, from CruDiv6, Gotō commanded an element of the "Main Body Support Force," providing cover, along with the light aircraft carrier , for the Operation Mo offensive, including landings on Tulagi and an attempted assault on Port Moresby, New Guinea that resulted in the Battle of the Coral Sea.

Operating from Kavieng, New Ireland, and Rabaul, New Britain, Gotō's CruDiv6 supported Japanese naval operations during the first several months of the Guadalcanal campaign. CruDiv6, with other Japanese warships and under the overall command of Gunichi Mikawa, participated in the Battle of Savo Island on 8 August 1942 resulting in the sinking of four Allied cruisers. On the return trip to Kavieng, however, Kako was torpedoed and sunk. On 11 October, the remaining three cruisers of CruDiv6 approached Guadalcanal at night to bombard the Allied airbase at Henderson Field as well as to support a large "Tokyo Express" run occurring the same evening. Gotō's force was surprised by a force of American cruisers and destroyers under the command of U.S. Rear Admiral Norman Scott. In the resulting Battle of Cape Esperance, Gotō was mortally wounded onboard Aoba and died later on 12 October.

Notes

References

Books

External links 

 - somewhat inaccurate on details, since it was written during the war

1888 births
1942 deaths
Military personnel from Ibaraki Prefecture
Japanese admirals of World War II
Japanese military personnel killed in World War II
Imperial Japanese Navy admirals